Sang-e Sefid (also Romanized as Sang-e Sefīd, Sang-e Safīd, Sang-i-Safīd, and Sang Sefīd) is a village in Abrumand Rural District, in the Central District of Bahar County, Hamadan Province, Iran. At the 2006 census, its population was 780, in 162 families.

References 

Populated places in Bahar County